Xu Yuanchong (18 April 1921 – 17 June 2021) was a Chinese translator, best known for translating Chinese ancient poems into English and French. He was a professor at Peking University since 1983.

Early career

Xu Yuanchong was born in Nanchang County (now Nanchang), Jiangxi. His mother, who was well educated and good at painting, had great impact on Xu in his pursuit of beauty and literature. His uncle Xiong Shiyi was a translator, who translated the play Wang Baochuan and Xue Pinggui into English, which was a hit in the UK. Xiong's achievement gave Xu a strong interest in learning English. When studying at the Provincial Nanchang No. 2 High School, he excelled in English. In 1938 he was admitted to the Department of Foreign Languages, National Southwest Associated University. In 1939, as a freshman, he translated his first work, Lin Huiyin's poem "Do not throw away" into English, which was published in the "Literary Translation News".

Style
His translation style is characterized by favouring domesticating translation. Xu introduced the Creation for Loss and the three beauties-concept to translation theory: the idea that a translation should be as beautiful as the original in three ways:
semantically (the -deeper- meaning)
phonologically (the style like rhyme and rhythm)
logically (amongst others: length)
According to Gao, "he advocates that the versions of poems should combine visual and aural beauties together, and they should reproduce the fusion of pictorial composition and musical arrangement."

Achievements
His 30 Poetries were selected as teaching materials by foreign universities. After reading his English translation "Selected Poems of Li Bai" (1987), Qian Zhongshu said: If you live in the same age with Li Bai, you'll become good friends. The British Press, "Romance of The Western Bower", which is thought as great as "Romeo and Juliet" in terms of artistic and attractiveness. British publishing company Penguin has published Xu Yuanchong's "300 China's immortal poems" (1994), which was launched in Britain, USA, Canada, Australia and other countries. That's the first time that the publishing company published a Chinese translation.
Apart from translating the classical Chinese poetry into foreign languages, Xu Yuanchong also translated many of the British and French classics into Chinese. In his seventies, he was still involved in translating Proust's masterpiece, "Remembrance of Things Past" (1990) and translated Flaubert's "Madame Bovary" (1992), Stendhal's "Red" (1993). At the age of 78 years, Xu also published a voluminous long masterpiece, the translation of Romain Rolland's "John Kristof" (1999). Xu was awarded the "Lifetime achievements in translation" from the Translators Association of China (TAC) in 2010.
On August 2, 2014, at the 20th World Conference of the Federation of International Translators (FIT), FIT conferred The "Aurora Borealis" Prize on Xu Yuanchong, who is the first Chinese winner of the award.

Works
 My Most Beloved: Tang & Song Verses
 Selected Poems and Pictures of Song Dynasty
 Laws Divine and Human and Pictures of Deities
 Gems of Classical Chinese Poetry
 Romance of The Western Bower
 Classic of Poetry (《》)
 Chu Ci (Qu Yuan) (《》)
 Tao Te Ching (Laozi) (《》)
 Analects (Kongzi) (《》)
 The Story of the Western Wing (Wang Shifu) (《》)
 The Peony Pavilion (Tang Xianzu) (《》)
 The Palace of Eternal Life (Hong Sheng) (《》)
 The Peach Blossom Fan (Kong Shangren) (《》)
 Poetry of Li Bai (Li Bai) (《》)
 Three Hundred Tang Poems (Sun Zhu) (《》)
 One Hundred Song Poems (《》)
 Poetry of Mao Zedong (Mao Zedong)
 The Red and the Black (Stendhal) (《》)
 Jean-Christophe (Romain Rolland) (《》)
 Madame Bovary (Gustave Flaubert) (《》)
 In Search of Lost Time (Marcel Proust) (《》)

Awards
 Chinese Translation Association - Competent Translator (2004)
 Chinese translation Culture Lifetime Achievement Award (2010)

Personal life
Xu married Zhao Jun in 1959 in Beijing, they have a son, Xu Ming, also a translator. His wife died in 2018, aged 85.

He turned 100 on 18 April 2021 and died just under two months later, on 17 June in Beijing.

References

External links

 Television show about Xu, CCTV-10 (in Chinese)

1921 births
2021 deaths
Republic of China translators
Chinese centenarians
People's Republic of China translators
Writers from Jiangxi
Educators from Jiangxi
People from Nanchang
Academic staff of Peking University
English–Chinese translators
Chinese–English translators
French–Chinese translators
Chinese–French translators
20th-century Chinese translators
21st-century Chinese translators
National Southwestern Associated University alumni
Men centenarians